A cashback website is a type of reward website that pays its members a percentage of money earned when they purchase goods and services via its affiliate links.

Cashback shopping
Users of cashback websites can know ahead of time how much they stand to get back for their purchases at each specific retailer before they buy. Sites vary on what form of cashback rebates they offer their users. Some programs will provide the users with a percentage of the total purchase price, while others have a flat sum that they pay out for each action.

When a customer makes a purchase online, instead of visiting the retailer directly, they may choose to follow a link from a cashback website to generate a monetary reward when buying products or services. The cashback website receives a commission from the retailer that, after the purchase is confirmed, is shared with the customer who made the purchase.

The amount of time that it takes to receive the cashback benefits is dependent on the site. Certain sites will make their payments every four to six weeks, while others will only issue their rebates after a few months. The time gap between purchase and cashback payment is observed to rule out cashback payment to cancelled or returned goods. 

Payment is generally made to the user in the form of bank transfers, gift vouchers, online sites such as PayPal, bank checks, mobile recharges or online orders at the request of the user. Some cashback websites place a threshold on a customer's account such that a user may need to make several transactions in order to be able to receive a reward.

Many cashback sites offer users a reward for referring others to the site. Some cashback sites also offer discussion forums, paid online surveys, daily deals, and other rewards to increase traffic and maintain customer loyalty.

References

Cashback and rebate
Reward websites